Bhalu Khaira is a village and a notified area in Aurangabad district in the Indian state of Bihar.

History
The village was founded by Mohammed Iqrajul Khan F/O Mohammad Abul Hassan Khan.

Geography
Bhalu Khaira is located at  It has an average elevation of Total area: 4.39 km² (1.69 mi²)
Total distance: 8.39 km (5.21 mi). Bhalu Khaira has a named Dhava River.

Demographics
 India census, Bhalu Khaira had a population of 10,389. Males constitute 52% of the population and females 48%. Rafiganj has an average literacy rate of 79%, more than the national average of 59.5%: male literacy is 55%, and female literacy is 41%. In Bhalu Khaira, 29% of the population is under 6 years of age.

Transportation
Bhalu Khaira is well connected with the Three Major city 'Rafiganj', 'Gaya' and 'Aurangabad' and three block subdivision 'Rafiganj' 'Goh','Obra', and 'Daudnagar'.

Local Transport
City Bus, Auto-Rickhaw, Taxi, and cycle rickshaw moves here generally to the local transport.

Roadways
Regular Bus service is from Rafiganj to Aurangabad, TATA, Ranchi, Kolkata, Dhanbad and Goh.

Educational institutions
 Bhalu Khaira Govt High School (Well Facility Urdu School)
 Govt Urdu Middle School Quazichak (Well Facilitate Urdu Middle school)
 British Academy (well renowned private school in Rafiganj) 
 R. B. R. High school
 Bosco international school
 Dr. V. K.Singh College Rafiganj
 High School Karma
 B.L. Indo Anglian Public School, Aurangabad, on NH-98 10 km from Rafiganj
 Sarswati Shishu Manadir
 Brite Life Public School (Affiliated from Delhi)
 Mother Teresa Academy [M.T.A] Managed by M.T.A Educational Trust W.B.
 All Rounder Communication Centre (ARCC) An ISO 9001 – 2008 Certified Organization (a unit of Shams Foundation)
 Dav Public School, located at Choudhary Gali Rafiganj (Affiliated from Delhi)
 Sanjay Singh Yadav College

References

See also
 Wikipedia:WikiProject Indian cities

Cities and towns in Aurangabad district, Bihar